Watalgan is a rural locality in the Bundaberg Region, Queensland, Australia. In the  Watalgan had a population of 38 people.

History 
Watalgan Provisional School opened on 7 February 1927. In August 1933 it became Watalgan State School. It closed on 13 May 1963.

In the  Watalgan had a population of 38 people.

References 

Bundaberg Region
Localities in Queensland